Willow Tree railway station is located on the Main Northern line in New South Wales, Australia. It serves the village of Willow Tree, opening on 13 August 1877 as Warrah when the line was extended from Murrururundi to Quirindi. It was renamed Willow Tree in 1879.

The station has one platform and a passing loop. It had a locomotive turntable, primarily for bank engines used on the steeply graded banks over the Liverpool Range to Ardglen Tunnel south of the village. Aurizon and Pacific National still use bank locomotives on some services today.

Services
Willow Tree is served by NSW TrainLink's daily Northern Tablelands Xplorer service operating between Armidale/Moree and Sydney.
Due to the length of the platform, only the Moree section of the train stops on the platform. This station is a request stop, so the train only stops here if passengers have booked to board/alight here.

References

External links
Willow Tree station details Transport for New South Wales

Easy Access railway stations in New South Wales
Railway stations in Australia opened in 1877
Regional railway stations in New South Wales
Liverpool Plains Shire
Main North railway line, New South Wales